is a rugby union Welsh-language television programme shown on S4C. Produced by BBC Cymru Wales, the show is amongst the most popular programmes shown on S4C. The show was known as  until the beginning of the 2014–15 season.

Format
The show is presented by Gareth Rhys Owen with analysis provided by Deiniol Jones and Andrew Coombs and commentary by Gareth Charles and former Wales captain Gwyn Jones. Catrin Heledd and Owain Gwynedd are touchline reporters.

's main coverage as of the 2015–16 season is of the Pro14, with a live game shown in every league round, where possible including a Welsh regional side. The Six Nations Championship is broadcast under the title . Highlights of the Principality Premiership and the SWALEC Cup are shown, with the final of the SWALEC Cup being televised live.

Live Pro 14 games are usually shown on Friday afternoons.

The other rugby union competitions which S4C have the rights to show highlights for are broadcast as separate programmes, namely  for the European Rugby Champions Cup,  for coverage of Welsh regions in the knockout rounds of the European Rugby Challenge Cup, and Top 14:  for the French Top 14. These programmes share some presenters and commentators.

English-language commentary is usually provided via a red button service, unless the rights to broadcast the match commentary in English is held by another broadcaster.

Awards
The programme won a BAFTA Cymru Best Live Coverage/Outside Broadcast award in 1999 and in 2005.

In 2002 the programme won the Royal Television Society Regional Sports Programme of the Year award, becoming the first Welsh-language programme to win a RTS Sport Award.

The coverage started on 9 June 2007 when the Crusaders hosted Barrow Raiders at the Brewery Field at 6.30 pm. They eventually showed nine matches over two years.

See also
Scrum V, an English-language rugby union television programme also produced by BBC Cymru Wales.
S4C Sport

References

Clwb Rygbi
Clwb Rygbi
Sports television in Wales
Clwb Rygbi
Clwb Rygbi
Rugby union in Wales
Rugby league in Wales
BBC Sport
1997 British television series debuts